No, Not Me, Never is the debut studio album by American indie rock band The Photo Atlas. The album was released in 2006 on the Morning After Records label but later re-released on 6 March 2007 on the Stolen Transmission record label. The song "Red Orange Yellow" was featured in video games Burnout Dominator and Burnout Paradise.

Track listing
"Electric Shock" – 3:06 	 	 	 	 
"Merit" – 3:17
"Light and Noise" – 3:58
"The Walls Have Eyes" – 3:28
"She Was a Matador" – 2:52
"Red Orange Yellow" – 3:09
"Broadcasting Feedback" – 3:12
"Little Tiny Explosions" – 3:52
"Cutback" – 3:23
"Handshake Heart Attack" – 3:30

Personnel
The Photo Atlas
Alan Andrews – lead vocals, guitar
Bill Threlkeld III – guitar
Mark Hawkins – bass guitar
Devon Shirley – drums sampling

Technical personnel
The Photo Atlas – production
Andrew Vastola – production, engineering, mixing
Adam Lancaster – production
Daniel Rutherford – production
Matt Sandoski – mastering

References

2007 debut albums
The Photo Atlas albums